Lamnamoonlek Tded99 is a Thai Muay Thai fighter.

Biography and career
Lamnamoonlek started Muay Thai at the age of 7 inspired by his older brothers Lamnamoon Sakchaichot and Lamnamkhong Sakchaichot. He trained at the Sakchaichot camp for eight years before moving to Teeded99.

On September 28, 2019 Lamnamoonlek faced Chorfah Tor.Sangtiennoi for the OneSongchai S-1 Super Featherweight title. Lamnamoonlek won by decision.

On September 16, 2020 defeated Extra Sit.Worapat by decision at Rajadamnern Stadium. This fight would be the beginning of an extensive winning streak. On October 22, 2020 Lamanamoonlek faced for the fifth time the most recent Sports Authority of Thailand Fighter of the Year Kiewpayak Jitmuangnon at Rajadamnern Stadium. He won by third round knockout.

On February 28, 2021 Lamanamoonlek faced the reigning 126 lbs Thailand champion Phetphuthai Sitsarawatseua at the channel 7 stadium and defeated him by decision.

On September 22, 2021 at Lumpinee Stadium, Lamnamoonlek faced Duangsompong Jitmuangnon who was on a three fights win streak and just defeated Petchdam PetchyindeeAcademy. Lamnamoonlek won by decision.

On November 26, 2021 Lamanamoonlek faced Mathias Gallo Cassarino in a weight handicap fight at Lumpinee stadium. Lamnamoonlek won by unanimous decision.

As of October 2021 he was ranked the #1 Lightweight contender in the world by the World Boxing Council Muaythai.

For his results during the year 2021 Lamnamoonlek was elected Fighter of the Year by the Sports Authority of Thailand.

On February 27, 2022 Lamanamoonlek had his first international fighting experience when he faced Gusein Tagirovich Aliev at MuayThai Night in Dubai for the vacant WMC World Lightweight title. Lamnamoonlek won the fight by unanimous decision.

Titles and accomplishments
World Muay Thai Council
 2022 WMC World Lightweight Champion
Onesongchai
 2019 S-1 Super Featherweight (130 lbs) Champion
Rajadamnern Stadium
 2022 Rajadamnern World Series 135 lbs Winner

Awards
 2021 Sports Authority of Thailand Fighter of the Year

Fight record

|-  style="background:#;"
| 2023-03-25 ||  || align=left| Sereyvanthong Win777 || RWS + Palangmai, Rajadamnern Stadium || Bangkok, Thailand ||  ||  || 
|-  style="background:#fbb;"
| 2023-02-12 || Loss ||align=left| Hiroki Kasahara || SHOOT BOXING 2023 act.1|| Tokyo, Japan || 3rd Ext.R Decision (Unanimous) || 6 || 3:00 
|-  style="background:#cfc;"
| 2022-12-23|| Win ||align=left| Mongkolkaew Sor.Sommai || Rajadamnern World Series - Final || Bangkok, Thailand || Decision (Unanimous) || 5 ||3:00
|-
! style=background:white colspan=9 |

|-  style="background:#cfc;"
| 2022-11-25|| Win ||align=left| Extra Rongsamuk  Or.Bor.JorUdon|| Rajadamnern World Series - Semi Final || Bangkok, Thailand || Decision (Unanimous)|| 3 || 3:00

|-  style="background:#cfc;"
| 2022-10-21|| Win ||align=left| Hicham Boulahri || Rajadamnern World Series - Group Stage|| Bangkok, Thailand || KO || 1 || 

|-  style="background:#cfc;"
| 2022-09-16||Win ||align=left| Buakiew Por.Paoin  || Rajadamnern World Series - Group Stage || Bangkok, Thailand ||  Decision (Unanimous) ||3  ||3:00 
|-  style="background:#fbb;"
| 2022-06-20|| Loss ||align=left| Flukenoi Kiatfahlikit || U-Muay RuamJaiKonRakMuayThai + Palangmai, Rajadamnern Stadium|| Bangkok, Thailand || Decision || 5 || 3:00
|-  style="background:#c5d2ea;"
| 2022-04-16|| Draw ||align=left| Sangmanee Sor.KafaeMuayThai ||Pitaktham + Sor.Sommai|| Phayao province, Thailand || Decision || 5 || 3:00 
|-  style="background:#cfc;"
| 2022-02-27|| Win||align=left| Gusein Aliev || Muaythai Night  || Dubai, UAE|| Decision (Unanimous)|| 5 ||3:00
|-
! style=background:white colspan=9 |

|-  style="background:#cfc;"
| 2021-12-30|| Win ||align=left| Duangsompong Jitmuangnon ||  Muay Thai SAT Super Fight WiteetinThai || Phuket, Thailand || Decision || 5||3:00

|-  style="background:#cfc;"
| 2021-11-26|| Win ||align=left| Mathias Gallo Cassarino ||  GoSport + Kiatpetch, Lumpinee Stadium || Bangkok, Thailand || Decision (Unanimous) ||5 ||3:00

|-  style="background:#cfc;"
| 2021-09-22|| Win ||align=left| Duangsompong Jitmuangnon  || Chef Boontham, Lumpinee Stadium|| Bangkok, Thailand || Decision||5 ||3:00

|- style="background:#cfc;"
|2021-02-28
|Win
| align="left" | Phetphuthai Sitsarawatseua
|Channel 7 Stadium
|Bangkok, Thailand
|Decision (Majority)
|5
|3:00

|-  style="background:#cfc;"
| 2020-10-22|| Win ||align=left| Kiewpayak Jitmuangnon  || Petchpatchara, Rajadamnern Stadium|| Bangkok, Thailand || KO (Left Cross)||3 ||

|-  style="background:#cfc;"
| 2020-09-16|| Win ||align=left| Extra Sit.Worapat || Petchchaopraya, Rajadamnern Stadium|| Bangkok, Thailand || Decision||5 ||3:00

|-  style="background:#fbb;"
| 2020-08-01|| Loss ||align=left| Kiewpayak Jitmuangnon  || SuekJaoMuayThai, Siam Omnoi Stadium || Bangkok, Thailand || Decision (Split)|| 5|| 3:00

|-  style="background:#cfc;"
| 2020-02-28|| Win ||align=left|  Kiewpayak Jitmuangnon  || Ruamponkonchon Pratan Super Fight || Pathum Thani, Thailand || Decision||5 ||3:00

|-  style="background:#fbb;"
| 2019-12-23|| Loss ||align=left| Mongkolkaew Sor.Sommai || Chef Boontham, Lumpinee Stadium|| Bangkok, Thailand || Decision||5 ||3:00

|-  style="background:#cfc;"
| 2019-11-20|| Win ||align=left| Yodtongthai Sor.Sommai|| Petchchaopraya, Rajadamnern Stadium|| Bangkok, Thailand || Decision||5 ||3:00

|-  style="background:#cfc;"
| 2019-09-28|| Win ||align=left| Chorfah Tor.Sangtiennoi|| Yodmuay Onesongchai, Royal Thai Air Force Sports Stadium  || Pathum Thani, Thailand || Decision || 5 || 3:00
|-
! style=background:white colspan=9 |

|-  style="background:#cfc;"
| 2019-08-22|| Win ||align=left| Mongkolkaew Sor.Sommai || Sor.Sommai, Rajadamnern Stadium|| Bangkok, Thailand || Decision||5 ||3:00

|-  style="background:#cfc;"
| 2019-07-09|| Win ||align=left| Mongkolkaew Sor.Sommai || Por Pattara + Tded99, Lumpinee Stadium|| Bangkok, Thailand || Decision||5 ||3:00

|-  style="background:#fbb;"
| 2019-05-29|| Loss ||align=left| Kiewpayak Jitmuangnon|| Rajadamnern Stadium || Bangkok, Thailand || Decision || 5 || 3:00

|-  style="background:#cfc;"
| 2019-04-25|| Win ||align=left| Yodkitsada Yuthachonburi || Sor.Sommai, Rajadamnern Stadium|| Bangkok, Thailand || Decision||5 ||3:00

|-  style="background:#fbb;"
| 2019-03-14|| Loss ||align=left| Mongkolkaew Sor.Sommai || Sor.Sommai, Rajadamnern Stadium|| Bangkok, Thailand || Decision||5 ||3:00

|-  style="background:#cfc;"
| 2019-01-10|| Win ||align=left| Mongkolchai Kwaitonggym || Sor.Sommai, Rajadamnern Stadium || Bangkok, Thailand || Decision || 5 || 3:00

|-  style="background:#cfc;"
| 2018-12-12 || Win ||align=left| Chanasuk Kor.Kampanat || Petchchaopraya, Rajadamnern Stadium || Bangkok, Thailand || Decision || 5 || 3:00

|-  style="background:#fbb;"
| 2018-09-27 || Loss ||align=left| Chankrit Or.Pimonsri  || Sor.Sommai Rajadamnern Stadium || Bangkok, Thailand || Decision || 5 || 3:00

|-  style="background:#cfc;"
| 2018-07-19 || Win ||align=left| Dechsakda Sitsongpeenong || Sor.Sommai, Rajadamnern Stadium || Bangkok, Thailand || Decision || 5 || 3:00

|-  style="background:#cfc;"
| 2018-06-28 || Win ||align=left| Chanasuk Kor.Kampanat || Sor.Sommai, Rajadamnern Stadium || Bangkok, Thailand || Decision || 5 || 3:00

|-  style="background:#cfc;"
| 2018-05-17 || Win ||align=left| Dechsakda Sitsongpeenong || Sor.Sommai, Rajadamnern Stadium || Bangkok, Thailand || Decision || 5 || 3:00

|-  style="background:#cfc;"
| 2018-04-13|| Win||align=left| Chanasuk Kor.Kampanat|| || Thailand || Decision || 5 || 3:00

|-  style="background:#fbb;"
| 2018-02-22 || Loss ||align=left| Kiewpayak Jitmuangnon  || Rajadamnern Stadium || Bangkok, Thailand || Decision || 5 || 3:00

|-  style="background:#cfc;"
| 2018-01-12|| Win||align=left| Chorfah Tor.Sangtiennoi|| Lumpinee Stadium  || Bangkok, Thailand || Decision || 5 || 3:00

|-  style="background:#cfc;"
| 2017-11-27|| Win||align=left| Yodkitsada Yuthachonburi|| Petchchaopraya, Rajadamnern Stadium  || Bangkok, Thailand || Decision || 5 || 3:00

|-  style="background:#cfc;"
| 2017-09-13|| Win||align=left| Komkiat Sor.Salachip|| Sor.Sommai, Rajadamnern Stadium  || Bangkok, Thailand || Decision || 5 || 3:00

|-  style="background:#cfc;"
| 2017-07-27|| Win||align=left| Yodkhunsuk Mor.RajahbatChombung || Sor.Sommai, Rajadamnern Stadium  || Bangkok, Thailand || Decision || 5 || 3:00

|-  style="background:#cfc;"
| 2017-07-03|| Win||align=left| Yodkitsada Yuthachonburi|| Bangrachan, Rajadamnern Stadium  || Bangkok, Thailand || Decision || 5 || 3:00

|-  style="background:#fbb;"
| 2017-06-12 || Loss ||align=left| Chankrit Or.Pimonsri  || Bangrachan, Rajadamnern Stadium  || Bangkok, Thailand || Decision || 5 || 3:00

|-  style="background:#cfc;"
| 2017-05-18|| Win||align=left| Yardfah R.Airline|| Bangrachan, Rajadamnern Stadium  || Bangkok, Thailand || Decision || 5 || 3:00

|-  style="background:#fbb;"
| 2017-02-22 || Loss ||align=left| Metee Sor.Jor.Toipaedriew  || Tor.Chaiwat, Rajadamnern Stadium  || Bangkok, Thailand || Decision || 5 || 3:00

|-  style="background:#fbb;"
| 2017-01-15 || Loss ||align=left| Sprinter Pangkongprab || Rangsit Stadium  || Rangsit, Thailand || Decision || 5 || 3:00

|-  style="background:#cfc;"
| 2016-12-17|| Win||align=left| Sanphet Numsaengkorsang|| Thanakorn Stadium  || Thailand || Decision || 5 || 3:00

|-  style="background:#cfc;"
| 2016-09-21|| Win||align=left| Phadetsuk Kor.Kampanat || Petchwittaya, Rajadamnern Stadium  || Bangkok, Thailand || Decision || 5 || 3:00

|-  style="background:#cfc;"
| 2016-04-30|| Win||align=left| Phetkriangkrai Tor.Silachai || Yod Muay Thairath TV, Thanakorn Stadium ||  Thailand || Decision || 5 || 3:00

|-  style="background:#fbb;"
| 2016-03-03|| Loss||align=left| Phadetsuk Kor.Kampanat || OneSongchai, Rajadamnern Stadium ||  Bangkok, Thailand || Decision || 5 || 3:00

|-  style="background:#cfc;"
| 2016-02-06|| Win||align=left| Phadetsuk Kor.Kampanat || Yod Muay Thairath TV, Thanakorn Stadium ||  Thailand || Decision || 5 || 3:00

|-  style="background:#cfc;"
| 2016-01-16|| Win||align=left| Phadetsuk Kor.Kampanat ||  Yod Muay Thairath TV, Thanakorn Stadium ||  Thailand || Decision || 5 || 3:00

|-  style="background:#fbb;"
| 2015-11-27|| Loss||align=left| Petcharat Wor.Wiwattananon|| Bangrachan, Rajadamnern Stadium ||  Bangkok, Thailand || Decision || 5 || 3:00

|-  style="background:#fbb;"
| 2015-11-19|| Loss||align=left| Pichitchai P.K.Saenchaimuaythaigym|| Bangrachan, Rajadamnern Stadium ||  Bangkok, Thailand || Decision || 5 || 3:00

|-  style="background:#cfc;"
| 2015-10-17|| Win||align=left| Fonpad Chuwattana  ||  Yod Muay Thairath TV, Thanakorn Stadium ||  Thailand || Decision || 5 || 3:00

|-  style="background:#c5d2ea;"
| 2015-09-23|| Draw||align=left| Fonpad Chuwattana  || Rajadamnern Stadium || Bangkok, Thailand || Decision || 5 || 3:00

|-  style="background:#cfc;"
| 2015-08-23|| Win ||align=left| Thanai-K Lukkaokwang || OneSongchai, Rajadamnern Stadium ||  Bangkok, Thailand || Decision || 5 || 3:00

|-  style="background:#cfc;"
| 2015-07-10|| Win ||align=left| Kundiew Payabkhamphan||  Lumpinee Stadium ||  Bangkok, Thailand || Decision || 5 || 3:00

|-  style="background:#cfc;"
| 2015-05-15|| Win ||align=left| Nongbeer PhayakMuangChon||  Lumpinee Stadium ||  Bangkok, Thailand || Decision || 5 || 3:00

|-  style="background:#fbb;"
| 2015-04-06|| Loss||align=left| Pichitchai P.K.Saenchaimuaythaigym||  Rajadamnern Stadium ||  Bangkok, Thailand || KO || 3 ||

|-  style="background:#fbb;"
| 2015-02-25|| Loss||align=left| Nichao SuwitGym||  Rajadamnern Stadium ||  Bangkok, Thailand || Decision || 5 || 3:00

|-  style="background:#cfc;"
| 2015-01-23|| Win ||align=left| Chuponglek Or.KamPhi||  Lumpinee Stadium ||  Bangkok, Thailand || Decision || 5 || 3:00

|-  style="background:#fbb;"
| 2014-09-20|| Loss||align=left|  Puenkon Tor.Surat || Omnoi Stadium || Bangkok, Thailand || Decision  || 5 || 3:00

|-
| colspan=9 | Legend:

References

Lamnamoonlek Tded99
Living people
1998 births